Ozivam dos Santos Bonfim (born 12 April 1975) is a Paralympic athlete from Brazil competing mainly in category T46 distance running events.

In the 2004 Summer Paralympics Ozivam competed in the 1500m and won a bronze medal in the T46 5000m.

References

External links 
 

1975 births
Living people
Paralympic athletes of Brazil
Brazilian male long-distance runners
Athletes (track and field) at the 2004 Summer Paralympics
Paralympic bronze medalists for Brazil
Medalists at the 2004 Summer Paralympics
Paralympic medalists in athletics (track and field)
Medalists at the 2007 Parapan American Games
20th-century Brazilian people
21st-century Brazilian people